Companies' Remuneration Reports Bill is a proposed United Kingdom Act of Parliament, which aims to amend the Companies Act 2006. It was moved from the House of Lords by Lord Gavron.

A short piece of legislation, it proposes to add a new section 430A to the Companies Act 2006. The Bill would require directors of public companies listed on the stock exchange in their annual Director Remuneration Report to disclose a statistical comparison between the salaries of the highest paid person in the company and the average pay of the lowest paid 10% workers of the company. The purpose of the Bill follows that of all reporting requirements, which is to enhance transparency. This may mean that shareholders have increased information by which to hold the board to account. It can also be useful for stakeholders that do not currently have voting rights within the company. The proposed provision states the following.

External links
Full text of the Bill at the Second Reading in the House of Lords
Parliament page for the proposed Bill's progress
Hansard from 24 April 2009

United Kingdom company law
Proposed laws of the United Kingdom
2009 in British law